The South Australian Amateur Soccer League (SAASL) run the largest association football competition in South Australia. The League comprises 8 divisions that compete on Saturdays and another 8 divisions on Sundays.

Saturday Competitions (2022)

Sunday Competitions (2022)

Champions

References

External links
Official Website of the SAASL

5